Basil Thomas Woodd (7 July 1815 – 4 June 1895) was a Conservative Party politician.

He was elected Conservative MP for Knaresborough in 1852 but lost the seat when it was reduced to one member in 1868. He then regained it in 1874 but again lost it in 1880.

References

External links
 

Conservative Party (UK) MPs for English constituencies
UK MPs 1852–1857
UK MPs 1857–1859
UK MPs 1859–1865
UK MPs 1865–1868
UK MPs 1874–1880
1815 births
1895 deaths